Abergele is a market town and community, situated on the north coast of Wales between the holiday resorts of Colwyn Bay and Rhyl, in Conwy County Borough and in the historic county of Denbighshire. Its northern suburb of Pensarn lies on the Irish Sea coast. Abergele and Pensarn railway station serves both resorts. Abergele is often overlooked due to the popularity of towns in nearby Rhyl, Prestatyn, Colwyn Bay, Llandudno and Conwy. Only 46.5% of the population was born in Wales as of the 2011 census.

Etymology 
It has also been suggested this river is named because its waters flash brightly.
Abergele is often mispronounced as ah-bear-geh-lee by non-native Welsh speakers.

Geography

The town itself lies on the A55 road and is known for Gwrych Castle. The town is surrounded by woodland covered hillsides, which contain caves with the rare lesser horseshoe bat. The highest hill is Moelfre Isaf (1040 ft) to the south of the town.

There are views from Cefn-yr-Ogof (669 ft), Gallt-y-Felin-Wynt (Tower Hill) (587 ft) and Castell Cawr (known locally as Tan y Gopa and nicknamed 'Lôn garu' (Lover's Lane)) which is 189 metres (620 feet). Castell Cawr is an Iron Age hillfort, one of several in the area. Dinorben hillfort to the east of town was destroyed in the 1980s.

Abergele (including Pensarn) has a population of around 10,000 and is part of the Abergele/Rhyl/Prestatyn urban area with a population of 64,000. 
Approximately 29% of Abergele has a significant knowledge of Welsh. The town has satellite villages such as Saint George, Betws yn Rhos, Rhyd-y-foel, Belgrano, Llanddulas and Llanfair Talhaearn.

Pensarn and Belgrano are significantly less Welsh than the rest of town, with 69.3% of people having no Welsh identity in the 2011 census.

History

Abergele was the site of an important clas (Celtic monastery) and remained settled into the 13th century. A "Prince Jonathan of Abergeleu" is listed by the B text of the Annals of Wales as dying during the 9th century reign of Rhodri the Great, although Charles-Edwards has supposed him to have simply been the monastery's abbot. Edward I is known to have briefly stayed there in December 1294 during his invasion of Wales to suppress the revolt of Madog ap Llywelyn.

Sites of historical interest include two Iron Age hillforts; Castell Cawr at Tan y Gopa and Dinorben (now virtually disappeared owing to limestone quarrying) at St. George. On Gallt y Felin Wynt, a hill above the town known as Bryn Tŵr or by its English name 'Tower Hill', is a 17th-century windmill, partially restored in 1930. There is another Iron Age fort at Pen y Corddyn Mawr hill above Rhyd y Foel. There is also another watchtower, 'Tŵr Arglwyddes Emily' or 'Lady Emily's Tower', which is located near Cefn yr Ogof.

Gwrych Castle was built between 1819 and 1825 at the behest of Lloyd Hesketh Bamford-Hesketh. From 1894 until 1946 it was the residence of the Dundonald family. Gwrych Castle's present owner, California businessman Nick Tavaglione, who bought the landmark in December 1989, put Gwrych up for auction on 2 June 2006, but it failed to sell. The condition of the property is being monitored by the Gwrych Castle Preservation Trust. It is undergoing renovation.

The boxers Bruce Woodcock (in the late 1940s) and Randolph Turpin (in 1952) trained at Gwrych Castle. The film Prince Valiant, was filmed there in 1996, starring Edward Fox and Katherine Heigl.

A curious undated inscription can be found on a tombstone in St Michael's parish church (built on the site of the old clas). It states "Here lieth in St Michael's churchyard a man who had his dwelling three miles to the north." As the sea is little more than half a mile away at this point, this suggests that the sea has made some considerable advance over the centuries.

Outside the church is a penitential stone where sinners had to do penance by standing, dressed in white, by the stone and beseech the congregation for mercy as they entered and left the church.

The 1868 Abergele rail disaster was, at that time, the worst railway disaster in Britain. The 33 people who died are buried in a mass grave in the local churchyard.

Abergele Sanitorium was built just outside Abergele in 1910; it became a community hospital in the 1980s.

On 30 June 1969, the evening before the Investiture of the Prince of Wales in Caernarfon, two members of Mudiad Amddiffyn Cymru (Welsh Defence Movement), Alwyn Jones and George Taylor, were killed when the bomb they were planting outside government offices exploded prematurely.

In 2020 Abergele hosted the 20th edition of I'm a Celebrity...Get Me Out of Here! at Gwrych Castle, and in 2021 it hosted the 21st series due to the Covid pandemic restrictions in Australia.

Notable people
 Lloyd Hesketh Bamford-Hesketh (1788–1861), owner of the Gwrych Castle and High Sheriff of Denbighshire in 1828.
 Emrys ap Iwan (1848–1906) a Welsh literary critic and writer on politics and religion. 
 Aylward M. Blackman (1883–1956 in Abergele) Egyptologist, excavated sites in Egypt and Nubia
 Mervyn Roberts (1906–1990), a Welsh composer, known for his piano music.
 David Vaughan (born 1983), footballer with 476 club caps and 42 for Wales
 Georgia Wilson (born 1995), paralympic equestrian

References

External links

 A Vision of Britain Through Time
 Abergele Post
 Abergele Town Council
 British Listed Buildings
 Clwyd Churches: Abergele
 Clwyd Churches: St George
 Eastern Conwy Churches Survey: Abergele
 Eastern Conwy Churches Survey: St George
 
 Geograph
 Gwrych Castle
 Gwrych Castle Preservation Trust
 Manchester City Council: Recollections from TB Sanatorium
 Office for National Statistics
 Rhyl, Prestatyn and Abergle Journal
 Wales DNA Project

 
Towns in Conwy County Borough
Communities in Conwy County Borough